Matt Brennan (born 1979) is an author, musician, and academic. His published work focuses on popular music and society. He is currently Reader (Associate Professor) in Popular Music at the University of Glasgow.

Career and publications 
Brennan's research has garnered significant press coverage, particularly his work on the cost of recorded music and the value of the live music sector.

His first monograph, When Genres Collide, was named as one of music website Pitchfork's "Favourite Music Books of 2017" and earned an Honorable Mention in the Association of American Publishers’ PROSE Awards for best "Music and Performing Arts" book. His second monograph, Kick It: A Social History of the Drum Kit, was named as one of the 'Best Music Books of 2020' by the Financial Times.

Brennan has authored, co-authored, and co-edited several books listed below:

 2021: (co-edited with Joseph Michael Pignato and Daniel Akira Stadnicki) The Cambridge Companion to the Drum Kit, Cambridge University Press.
2021: (co-authored with Simon Frith, Martin Cloonan, and Emma Webster) The History of Live Music in Britain 1985-2015: From Live Aid to Live Nation, Routledge.
2020: Kick It: A Social History of the Drum Kit, Oxford University Press.
2019: (co-authored with Simon Frith, Martin Cloonan, and Emma Webster) The History of Live Music in Britain 1968-1984: From Hyde Park to the Haçienda, Routledge.
2017: When Genres Collide: Down Beat, Rolling Stone, and the Struggle Between Jazz and Rock, Bloomsbury.
 2017: (co-edited with Gareth Dylan Smith, Zack Moir, Shara Rambarran, and Philip Kirkman) The Routledge Research Companion to Popular Music Education, Routledge.
 2013: (co-authored with Simon Frith, Martin Cloonan, and Emma Webster) The History of Live Music in Britain 1950-1967: From Dance Hall to the 100 Club, Routledge.

Music 
Brennan currently records and performs music under the name Citizen Bravo. His first album as Citizen Bravo, Build A Thing Of Beauty, was released by Chemikal Underground in 2019. His sophomore album, a large scale collaborative work Return To Y'Hup: The World Of Ivor Cutler, was released in 2020 and received 4-star reviews in MOJO, Uncut, and The Observer.

Prior to his work as Citizen Bravo, Brennan was a founding member of the indie pop group Zoey Van Goey (2006-2012), which released two well received albums - The Cage Was Unlocked All Along in 2009 and Propeller Versus Wings in 2011 - on the Scottish record label Chemikal Underground. He also performed onscreen and on the soundtrack for the film God Help The Girl, which won the World Cinema Dramatic Special Jury Award for Best Ensemble at the 2014 Sundance Film Festival.

References 

Canadian musicologists
1979 births
Living people
Academics of the University of Edinburgh